van Moerbeke is a surname. Notable people with the surname include:

Pierre van Moerbeke (born 1944), Belgian mathematician
William of Moerbeke (1215– 1286), Latin translator

Surnames of Dutch origin